Brian Simon Horne (born 5 October 1967) is an English former footballer who played professionally as a goalkeeper for Millwall, Middlesbrough, Stoke City, Portsmouth and Hartlepool United.

Career
Horne was born in Billericay and began his career with Millwall making 38 appearances in his debut season of 1986–87. He played in 51 matches in 1987–88 as the "Lions" won the Second Division earning promotion to the First Division for the first time in their history with Horne winning the supporters player of the year award. He played 51 times again in 1988–89 as Millwall took the top tier well finishing in 10th position but they struggled in 1989–90 and were relegated. Horne remained at The Den in the Second tier making 36 appearances in 1990–91. He spent time out on loan at Middlesbrough in September 1992 and at Stoke City in October. At Stoke Horne played twice away at Chester City and at home to Cambridge United in the League Cup. He then joined Portsmouth as back up to Alan Knight playing five times in 1993–94. Horne ended his professional career with Hartlepool United playing in 83 matches in two seasons. He later played non-league football with Dover Athletic and Farnborough Town, and managed Aveley.

Career statistics

Honours
 Millwall
 Football League Second Division champions: 1987–88
 Millwall – Player of the Year: 1987

References

External links
 

1967 births
Living people
English footballers
Millwall F.C. players
Middlesbrough F.C. players
Stoke City F.C. players
Portsmouth F.C. players
Hartlepool United F.C. players
Dover Athletic F.C. players
Farnborough F.C. players
Premier League players
People from Billericay
England under-21 international footballers
English Football League players
English football managers
Aveley F.C. managers
Association football goalkeepers
Association football goalkeeping coaches
Chelmsford City F.C. non-playing staff